Kyogle Turkeys Rugby League Club is an Australian rugby league football club based in Kyogle, New South Wales in the Northern Rivers. They field both senior teams that compete in the Northern Rivers Rugby League competition and junior sides in the group one competition.

Notable players
Ken Nagas - Former Canberra Raiders (1992-02) player.
Nigel Roy - Former Illawarra Steelers (1993–94),  North Sydney Bears (1995–99), Northern Eagles (2000) &  London Broncos (2001–04) player.
Will Matthews - Former Gold Coast Titans (2008–11, 2018–19) & St George Illawarra Dragons (2012-2017) player.
Shannon Walker - Former Gold Coast Titans (2008–10) & Australia Rugby 7's (2012-2017) player.
Jone Macilai - Former  Fiji Bati (2008–09) player.
David Grant - Former Canberra Raiders (1982–85) captain and Balmain Tigers (1978–81), Eastern Suburbs Roosters (1977) & South Sydney Rabbitohs (1976) player.

Notable current / former Queensland Cup Players:
Alex Farrell - Mackay Cutters player.
Sam Saville - Tweed Heads Seagulls player.
Blake Anderson - Tweed Heads Seagulls player.

Premierships
Kyogle's A grade side won premierships in: 1971, 1983
Kyogle's Reserve grade side won premierships in: 1987
Kyogle's Under 18's side won premierships in: 2014, 2015

See also

Rugby league in New South Wales

References

External links
Kyogle Turkeys on Facebook - https://www.facebook.com/kyogle.rlfc
http://hammoanddi.blogspot.com/2014/09/blog-49-7th-to-17th-september-2014.html
http://crlnsw.com.au/2019-coaches-wanted-kyogle-senior-league/

Rugby league teams in New South Wales
Northern Rivers
Kyogle Council
Rugby clubs established in 1960